Oka Oori Katha (English title: The Marginal Ones; Telugu: ఒక ఊరి కథ) is a 1977 Indian Telugu-Language drama film directed by Mrinal Sen. The Pan-Indian film is based on the story Kafan by Munshi Premchand. The Marginal Ones was one of the Indian entries at the 4th Hong Kong International Film Festival. It was featured in the Karlovy Vary International Film Festival, Carthage Film Festival, and the Indian Panorama section of the 7th IFFI.

It won the "Special Jury Prize (Karlovy Vary IFF)"; and the Best Feature Film in Telugu at the 25th National Film Awards, "for successfully transforming Premchand's story "Kafan" into a scathing commentary on rural destitution and social injustice; for projecting through powerful performances of its leading characters, the degradation and brutalisation of human beings, for its sincere commitment to the cause of the downtrodden; for its fervent impassioned appeal to the conscience of humanity" as cited by the Jury.

The plot
Venkaiah (Vasudeva Rao) and his son Kistaiah (Narayana Rao) live in a village. Venkaiah lives in a queer world of his own. They have learnt to conquer hunger and are mentally strong. They consider that the poor farmers are fools to work for the rich and suffer. Kistaiah wants to marry Nilamma (Mamata Shankar). The father does not like the marriage. Kistaiah refuses and marries Nilamma.

Nilamma tries to control the family. Venkaiah does not change. Kistaiah stands between them. There is bitterness in the family. In course of time, Nilamma conceives. One day, they find Nilamma in acute pain. The father refuses to call a midwife and Nilamma dies. They decide to conduct funeral rites for Nilamma. They go begging around the village and gather some money and decide to spend it on drinks.

Credits

Cast
 A. R. Krishna
 Pradeep Kumar
 G. V. Narayana Rao as Kistaiah
 M. V. Vasudeva Rao as Venkaiah
 Mamata Shankar as Nilamma
 Chintapally Bhadra Reddy as Zamindar

Crew
 Director: Mrinal Sen
 Story: Munshi Premchand
 Screenplay: Mohit Chattopadhyay
 Writer: Yandamoori Veerendranath (dialogues)
 Producer: A. Parandhama Reddy
 Original Music: Vijay Raghav Rao
 Cinematography: K. K. Mahajan
 Assistant Cameraman: Nadeem Khan
 Film Editing: Gangadhar Naskar
 Art Direction: B. Kalyan

Awards
National Film Awards
National Film Award for Best Feature Film in Telugu - Mrinal Sen and A. Parandhama Reddy

Nandi Awards
 Third Best Feature Film -  Bronze - A. Parandhama Reddy

International Honors
 Karlovy Vary International Film Festival - Special Jury Award
 Carthage Film Festival - Special Award

References

External links
 

1977 films
1970s Telugu-language films
Films about labour
Films directed by Mrinal Sen
Adaptations of works by Premchand
Best Telugu Feature Film National Film Award winners
Films about social issues in India
Films about women in India
Indian avant-garde and experimental films
Indian nonlinear narrative films
Social realism in film
Indian feminist films
Films about poverty in India
Films about dysfunctional families
Midlife crisis films
Indian family films
Indian drama films
Films based on works by Premchand